Texas school shooting may refer to:

Grades K–12 schools
 Santa Fe High School shooting, Santa Fe, Texas, May 18, 2018
 Robb Elementary School shooting, Uvalde, Texas, May 24, 2022

Post-secondary schools
 University of Texas tower shooting, Austin, Texas, August 1, 1966

See also
 Assassination of John F. Kennedy by Lee Harvey  Oswald shooting from the Texas School Book Depository in Dallas, Texas, November 22, 1963
 List of mass shootings in the United States